The New Hampton Pony Pratt Truss Bridge is a historic pony Pratt truss bridge on Shoddy Mill Road in New Hampton of Lebanon Township, Hunterdon County, New Jersey. It crosses the Musconetcong River between Lebanon Township, Hunterdon County and Washington Township, Warren County. It was designed by Francis C. Lowthorp and built in 1868 by William Cowin of Lambertville, New Jersey.  The bridge was added to the National Register of Historic Places on July 26, 1977 for its significance in engineering, industry and transportation. It is one of the few early examples of iron Pratt truss bridges remaining in the United States. It was later documented by the Historic American Engineering Record in 1991. It was added as a contributing property to the New Hampton Historic District on April 6, 1998.

Description
The New Hampton bridge is one of three remaining composite cast iron and wrought iron Pratt truss bridges built by Cowin in New Jersey. The others are the Glen Gardner Pony Pratt Truss Bridge (1870) in Glen Gardner and the Main Street Bridge (1870) in Clinton. Its end posts are vertical, octagonal iron tubes topped square decorative caps.

Gallery

See also
 National Register of Historic Places listings in Hunterdon County, New Jersey
 National Register of Historic Places listings in Warren County, New Jersey
List of bridges documented by the Historic American Engineering Record in New Jersey
List of bridges on the National Register of Historic Places in New Jersey

References

External links
 

Lebanon Township, New Jersey
Washington Township, Warren County, New Jersey
Pratt truss bridges in the United States
National Register of Historic Places in Hunterdon County, New Jersey
National Register of Historic Places in Warren County, New Jersey
Road bridges on the National Register of Historic Places in New Jersey
Historic district contributing properties in New Jersey
Historic district contributing properties in Hunterdon County, New Jersey
Individually listed contributing properties to historic districts on the National Register in New Jersey
Historic American Engineering Record in New Jersey
New Jersey Register of Historic Places
Bridges completed in 1868
1868 establishments in New Jersey
Iron bridges in the United States
Bridges over the Musconetcong River